Tanbark is a neighborhood in southeastern Lexington, Kentucky, United States. Its boundaries are Man o' War Boulevard to the north, Tates Creek Road to the west, Hartland Parkway to the south, and Rapid Run Drive to the east.

Neighborhood statistics

 Area: 
 Population: 323
 Population density: 2,156 people per square mile
 Median household income (2010): $45,474

References

Neighborhoods in Lexington, Kentucky